"Brand New Girlfriend" is a song written by Jeffrey Steele, Shane Minor and Bart Allmand, and recorded by American country music singer Steve Holy.  It was released in January 2006 as the first single and title track from the album Brand New Girlfriend.

Background
In an interview with CMT, Holy said that he personally connected with the song the first time that he heard it, stating that "I won't say it was my life story, but it had all my sarcasm. It was almost as if this song was written for me." Holy also indicated that he believed before he recorded the song that it would later gain significant popularity.

Music video
The music video was directed by Eric Welch and premiered in late July 2006.

Cover versions
Zach Seabaugh covered the song on The Voice (U.S. season 9) during the Live Playoffs round.

Charts

Year-end charts

Certifications

References

2006 songs
Steve Holy songs
Songs written by Jeffrey Steele
Songs written by Shane Minor
Curb Records singles